After Dark, My Sweet is a 1990 American neo-noir crime thriller film directed by James Foley and starring Jason Patric, Bruce Dern, and Rachel Ward. It is based on the 1955 Jim Thompson novel of the same name.

Plot
Ex-boxer Kevin "Kid" Collins is a drifter and an escapee from a mental hospital.  In a desert town near Palm Springs he meets widow Fay Anderson who convinces him to help fix up the neglected estate her husband left and lets him sleep in a trailer out back, near her dying date palms.

Her acquaintance "Uncle Bud" shows up. Calling himself an ex-cop, he has long been hatching a scheme to kidnap a rich man's child and needs somebody like Collins to help carry it out.

Reluctant in the beginning, Collins tries to leave and encounters Doc Goldman, who immediately can tell the young man needs to be under medical observation. Doc takes a personal interest in Collins that might include a physical attraction as well. He intrudes on Collins' relationship with the alcoholic Fay.

Collins is persuaded by Uncle Bud to execute the kidnapping plan.

Cast
 Jason Patric as Kevin "Kid" Collins
 Rocky Giordani as Bert
 Rachel Ward as Fay Anderson
 Bruce Dern as Garrett "Uncle Bud" Stoker
 Mike Hagerty as Truck Driver
 George Dickerson as Doc Goldman
 Corey Carrier as Jack

Production

Filming locations
Filming took place in Mecca, California, part of the Coachella Valley.

Reception

Critical response
Film critic Roger Ebert put this on his "Great Movies" list and wrote in his Chicago Sun-Times review: "After Dark, My Sweet is the movie that eluded audiences; it grossed less than $3 million, has been almost forgotten, and remains one of the purest and most uncompromising of modern film noir. It captures above all the lonely, exhausted lives of its characters."

Variety also received the film favorably: "Director-cowriter James Foley has given this near-perfect adaptation of a Jim Thompson novel a contempo setting and emotional realism that make it as potent as a snakebite...Lensed in the arid and existential sun-blasted landscape of Indio, Calif, the pungently seedy film creates a kind of genre unto itself, a film soleil, perhaps."

Writer David M. Meyers praised the script: "The screenplay, which hews closely to Jim Thompson's heartless novel, is unusually tight, spare, and well constructed."

Peter Travers of The Rolling Stone wrote: "Patric is sensational as Collie; the pretty-boy actor ... is unrecognizable behind Collie's coarse stubble, slack jaw and haunted stare. Patric occupies a complex character with mesmerizing conviction. Like Thompson's prose, his performance is both repellent and fascinating."

When the video was released in 1991, Entertainment Weekly film critic Melissa Pierson wrote: "Fittingly, director James Foley (At Close Range) puts style over story, capturing the gritty, long-shadowed tone of his source material. After Dark, My Sweet looks simultaneously crisp and drenched in the yellow light of a strange dream, an effect that becomes especially haunting on video. In this alluring tour through unsettled emotional territory, Jason Patric (The Lost Boys) gives an exceptionally sharp performance as an ex-boxer with one screw loose and another turned down tight. He's drawn into a kidnapping scheme concocted by a former cop (Bruce Dern) and a sultry widow (Rachel Ward). Together, they visit a place where desire and pain are indistinguishable, and everything goes twistingly awry."

In an interview with Robert K. Elder for his book The Best Film You've Never Seen, director Austin Chick praises the movie for its cinematography, stating: "It's beautifully shot ... every frame and every camera move is clearly thought out and brilliantly, beautifully executed."

The review aggregator Rotten Tomatoes reports an 83% approval rating, based on 18 reviews, with an average rating of 6.5/10.

References

External links

 
 
 
 
 After Dark, My Sweet at Film Noir of the Week by film historian Alain Silver
  (Lionsgate Entertainment YouTube account)

1990 films
1990 crime thriller films

American crime thriller films
1990s English-language films
Films based on American novels
Films based on Jim Thompson novels
Films based on thriller novels
Films directed by James Foley
Films scored by Maurice Jarre
Films set in Palm Springs, California
American neo-noir films
1990s psychological thriller films
Films about kidnapping
1990s American films